Polypetalae was a taxonomic grouping used in the identification of plants, but it is now considered to be an artificial group, one that does not reflect evolutionary history.  The grouping was based on similar morphological plant characteristics. Polypetalae was defined as including plants with the petals free from the base or only slightly connected. Members of Polpetalae contain bitegmic ovules (i.e., ovules having two integuments).

See also
Plant identification
 Calyciflorae

External links
For an illustrated summary of polypetalae, see botanic gardens information
John Shaffner's key (1911)in the Ohio Naturalist 

Historically recognized angiosperm taxa